Humber was a provincial electoral district (riding) in Ontario, Canada. It was created prior to the 1955 provincial election from parts of the York West and York South ridings. It was eliminated in 1996, when most of its territory was incorporated into the ridings of Etobicoke Centre and Etobicoke—Lakeshore. Humber was located in the municipalities of York, Toronto, and Etobicoke.

The riding went through two name changes and several boundary changes during its lifetime. From 1955 to 1963 it was known as York—Humber and existed mostly on the east side of the Humber River. From 1963 to 1987 it was known as Humber, and in 1987 it was changed to Etobicoke-Humber. From 1963 onwards it was mostly on the west side of the river.

Members of Provincial Parliament

Election results

York—Humber

Humber

Etobicoke—Humber

References

Notes

Citations

Former provincial electoral districts of Ontario
Provincial electoral districts of Toronto